The 1953 Oujda revolt was an anti-colonial revolt against the French protectorate, in the context of the Revolution of the King and the People, that took place in Oujda August 16, 1953. It was followed by a second insurrection in Tafoughalt the next day.

It came ten days after an "electoral tour" procession by Thami El Glaoui, who was campaigning to overthrow Sultan Muhammad V.

Aftermath 
The dead included European members of the "", Moroccans known to support Thami El Glaoui, and protesters. 96 Moroccans were prosecuted for their involvement.

References 

Massacres in Morocco
Massacres in 1953
Oujda